Moricons.dll is a dynamic-link library file containing icons.

The file was first distributed with Windows 3.0 and contained the icons for launching many popular DOS applications of the time, such as WordPerfect and Lotus 123. Windows setup included the option of searching the local drives for compatible DOS applications and if found, would create an item in Program Manager under the Applications program group, with an appropriate icon from the file.

moricons.dll was found in %SystemRoot%\System\moricons.dll on DOS based Windows installations, from Windows 3.0 to Windows Me.

On Windows NT based systems, including Windows 10, the file can be found in %SystemRoot%\System32\moricons.dll.
On Windows 2012 R2 Server (may be other variants too) these icons can be found in %SystemRoot%\system32\SHELL32.dll

Although all but deprecated, the file may be useful in giving a user created application or shortcut a custom icon.

Windows files